María João Falcão (born 16 November 1964) is a Portuguese rhythmic gymnast.

Falcão competed for Portugal in the rhythmic gymnastics individual all-around competition at the 1984 Summer Olympics in Los Angeles. There she was 22nd in the preliminary (qualification) round and did not advance to the final.

References

External links 
 María João Falcão at Sports-Reference.com

1964 births
Living people
Portuguese rhythmic gymnasts
Gymnasts at the 1984 Summer Olympics
Olympic gymnasts of Portugal